Al-Sawa'iq al-muhriqah is a book written by the Sunni Muslim scholar Ibn Hajar al-Haytami. It covers many areas such as how to send greetings upon the Islamic prophet Muhammad. The book also discusses the place of Shia Islam and attempts to expose and refute their claims. The book has been described as "one of the most devastating polemics ever written against the Shiite doctrine of the imāma and in defence of the first three caliphs."

Two refutations of Ibn Hajar's work have been written: "Al-Bahar Al-Murghaqa" by Ahmad bin Muhammad Al-Murtada and "Al-Sawarim Al-Muharraq" by Qazi Nurullah Shustari.

See also
 List of Sunni books

References

Sunni literature